Charles Nelson Lamison (1826April 24, 1896) was an American politician, soldier, and lawyer who was a two-term United States congressman from Ohio. He served in the United States House of Representatives from 1871 to 1875.

Early life and career 
Born in Columbia County, Pennsylvania, Lamison moved with his father in 1836 to Dalton, Ohio, where he was privately instructed in elementary branches. He studied law and was admitted to the bar in 1848, commencing practice in Dalton. In 1852, he moved to Lima, Ohio,  where he resumed practicing law and was elected prosecuting attorney of Allen County, Ohio, in 1853. He was defeated for reelection in the position in 1855, but was elected back again in 1857.

Civil War
At the outbreak of the Civil War, Lamison enlisted in the Union Army and was elected as the initial captain of Company F of the 20th Ohio Infantry, serving in Northern Virginia. He later assisted in raising the 81st Ohio Infantry of which he was appointed as the major.

Congress 
After the close of the war, he resumed practicing law in Lima and was an unsuccessful Democratic candidate for the United States House of Representatives in 1866. Lamison was elected to the House of Representatives in 1870, serving from 1871 to 1875, not being a candidate for renomination in 1874.

Later career and death 
Afterwards, he was appointed an attorney for several railroad companies and was appointed a United States land commissioner in 1892, headquartered in Dodge City, Kansas.

Lamison died in Topeka, Kansas, on April 24, 1896, and was interred in Woodlawn Cemetery in Lima, Ohio.

References
 Retrieved on 2008-02-14

1826 births
1896 deaths
Ohio lawyers
Democratic Party members of the United States House of Representatives from Ohio
Union Army officers
Politicians from Lima, Ohio
People from Columbia County, Pennsylvania
People from Dodge City, Kansas
People of Ohio in the American Civil War
19th-century American politicians
People from Wayne County, Ohio
19th-century American lawyers
Military personnel from Pennsylvania